Magick, Liber ABA, Book 4 is widely considered to be the magnum opus of 20th-century occultist Aleister Crowley, the founder of Thelema. It is a lengthy treatise on magick, his system of Western occult practice, synthesised from many sources, including Eastern Yoga, Hermeticism, medieval grimoires, contemporary magical theories from writers like Eliphas Levi and Helena Blavatsky, and his own original contributions. It consists of four parts: Mysticism, Magick (Elementary Theory), Magick in Theory and Practice, and ΘΕΛΗΜΑ—the Law (The Equinox of The Gods). It also includes numerous appendices presenting many rituals and explicatory papers.

In November 1911, Crowley carried out a ritual during which he reports being commanded to write Book 4 by a discarnate entity named "Abuldiz" (sometimes spelled "Ab-ul-diz") in Crowley's incomplete record of the working, which came around the time that Liber Legis was ready to be published in The Equinox No VII. The working was published in The Equinox No. VIII of Vol I. The writing of Book 4 was duly accomplished with the aid of his seer Soror Virakam (Mary Desti) at a villa in Posillipo near Naples, Italy, and was published in the winter of 1912–1913 in The Equinox No. VIII of Vol I.  Abuldiz appeared in Mary Desti's visions (as Crowley's seer) as an old man with a long white beard, wearing a ring which contained a white feather. Abuldiz communicated that there was a book to be given to Fra. P. (Frater Perdurabo = Crowley). The name of the book was Aba, and its number 4. Another being called Jezel was also in the room where the visions of Abuldiz were seen - he was described as a black-headed 'Turk' or 'Egyptian' wearing a "tarbush" (Fez) and a red sash; one of his hands was covered with crocodile skin. (Crowley comments in the text that Soror Virakam recognized the human counterparty of Jezel as Elias Pasha, the father of Veli Bey, a Turkish man whom Mary Desti married after she divorced Solomon Sturges.

Liber ABA refers to this work being a part of Crowley's system of magical works known as libri (Latin for 'books'). In most systems such as gematria where letters are given numerical value, ABA adds up to 4, a number which represents the Four Elements, Stability and so on (thus the name Book 4).

Much of the book was dictated by Crowley to his principal A∴A∴ students of the time, who would also ask questions to get clarification. The principal collaborators were Soror Virakam (Mary Desti or D'Este 1871-1931; mother of Preston Sturges and companion of Isadora Duncan), Leila Waddell (1880-1932; also known as Laylah and Soror Agatha), and Soror Rhodon (Mary Butts, 1890-1937), all of whom were given coauthorship credit. The book was also dedicated to Soror Ouarda (Rose Edith Crowley, 1874-1932); Frater Per Ardua (Maj.-Gen. John Frederick Charles Fuller, 1878-1966); Soror Alostrael (Leah Hirsig, 1883-1951) and Frater Volo Intelligere (Gerald Yorke, 1901-1983).

Contents

Part I: Mysticism
Part I is titled "Mysticism" with the sub-title "Meditation: The way of attainment of genius or Godhead considered as a development of the human brain." The section is essentially Crowley's system of yoga, which is designed to still the mind and enable single-pointed concentration. When developing his basic yogic program, Crowley borrowed heavily from many other yogis, such as Patanjali and Yajnavalkya, keeping their fundamental techniques while jettisoning much of the attendant moral dogma.

Yoga, as Crowley interprets it in this section, involves several key components. The first is Asana, which is the assumption (after eventual success) of any easy, steady and comfortable posture. Next is Pranayama, which is the control of breath, and Mantra yoga, which is the use of mantras. Yama and Niyama are the adopted moral or behavioural codes (of the adept's choosing) that will be least likely to excite the mind. Pratyahara is the stilling of the thoughts so that the mind becomes quiet. Dharana is the beginning of concentration, usually on a single shape, like a triangle, which eventually leads to Dhyana, the loss of distinction between object and subject, which can be described as the annihilation of the ego (or sense of a separate self). The final stage is Samādhi—Union with the All.

Part II: Magick (Elementary Theory)
Part II, "Magick (Elemental Theory)," deals with the accessories of ceremonial magick in detail. Subjects include: the temple, the magick circle, the altar, the scourge, dagger, and chain, the holy oil, the wand, cup, sword, pentacle, lamp, crown, robe, book, bell, lamen, and the Magick Fire (including the crucible and incense). This section also includes an "Interlude", which is a humorous exposition on the magical interpretations of popular nursery rhymes, such as Old Mother Hubbard and Little Bo Peep.

Part III: Magick in Theory and Practice
Part III is titled "Magick in Theory and Practice", and is perhaps the most influential section within Book 4. In this part, magick (with the terminal -k) is defined in Crowley's now famous "Introduction", which is the source of many well-known statements, such as
 "Magick is the Science and Art of causing Change to occur in conformity with Will."
 "Magick is the method of science and the aim of religion." 
 "Every intentional act is a Magical act."
 "Magick is the Science of understanding oneself and one's conditions. It is the Art of applying that understanding in action."
 "Magick is merely to be and to do."

It contains many influential essays on various magical formulae, such as Tetragrammaton, Thelema, Agape, AUMGN, and iao. The section also addresses fundamental magical theorems, essential components of ritual, and general practices (e.g. banishing, consecration, invocation, divination, etc.).

Part IV: ΘΕΛΗΜΑ—the Law
Part IV is titled "ΘΕΛΗΜΑ (Thelema)—the Law." This section deals with The Book of the Law, including the book itself, a brief biography of Crowley, the events leading up to its reception, and the conditions of the three days of its writing. This part is Crowley's 1936 book Equinox of the Gods only edited under a different name.

Appendices
The appendices include many rituals and practical essays on magical practice. The most recent volume includes a reading list, One Star in Sight (which lays out the program of his teaching Order, the A∴A∴), an essay on the Astral Plane, some key correspondences from Liber 777 (his work on The Tree of Life), many of the basic rituals of A∴A∴, and another exposition on the reception of Liber Legis.

Editions

See also
 Libri of Aleister Crowley
 List of magical terms and traditions
 List of works by Aleister Crowley

References

Ceremonial magic
Thelema
Thelemite texts
Works by Aleister Crowley